Timgad (known as Marciana Traiana Thamugadi) was a Roman city in the Aurès Mountains of Algeria. It was founded by the Roman Emperor Trajan around 100 AD. The full name of the city was Colonia Marciana Ulpia Traiana Thamugadi. Emperor Trajan named the city in commemoration of his mother Marcia, eldest sister Ulpia Marciana, and father Marcus Ulpius Traianus.

Located in modern-day Algeria, about 35 km east of the city of Batna, the ruins are noteworthy for representing one of the best extant examples of the grid plan as used in Roman town planning. Timgad was inscribed as a World Heritage Site by UNESCO in 1982.

Name 

In the former name of Timgad, Marciana Traiana Thamugadi, the first part – Marciana Traiana – is Roman and refers to the name of its founder, Emperor Trajan and his sister Marciana. The second part of the name – Thamugadi – "has nothing Latin about it". Thamugadi is the Berber name of the place where the city was built, to read Timgad plural form of Tamgut, meaning "peak", "summit".

History

 Although most of them had never seen Rome before, and Timgad was hundreds of miles away from the Italian city, Trajan invested heavily in Roman culture and identity.

The city enjoyed a peaceful existence for the first several hundred years and became a center of Christian activity starting in the 3rd century, and a Donatist center in the 4th century. During the Christian period, Timgad was a diocese which became renowned at the end of the 4th century when Bishop Optat became the spokesman for the Donatist movement. After Optat, Thamugadai had two bishops Gaudentius (Donatist) and Faustinus (Catholic).

In the 5th century, the city was sacked by the Vandals before falling into decline. Timgad was destroyed at the end of the 5th century by Berber tribes from the Aurès Mountains. In 535 CE, the Byzantine general Solomon found the city empty when he came to occupy it during the Vandalic War. The Byzantine Reconquest revived some activities in the city, defended by a fortress built to the south, in 539, reusing blocks removed from Roman monuments. In the following century, the city was briefly repopulated as a primarily Christian city.

The Arab invasion brought about the final ruin of Thamugadi and it ceased to be inhabited after the 8th century CE. Because no new settlements were founded on the site after the 7th century CE, the city was partially preserved under ground up to a depth of approximately one meter.

Travelling Northern Africa, British explorer James Bruce reached the city ruins on 12 December 1765, likely being the first European to visit the site in centuries and described the city as “a small town, but full of elegant buildings.” In 1790, he published the book Travels to Discover the Source of the Nile, where he described what he had found in Timgad. The book was met with skepticism in Great Britain, until 1875 when Robert Lambert Playfair, Britain's consul in Algiers, inspired by Bruce's account, visited the site. In 1877 Playfair described Timgad in more detail in his book Travels in the Footsteps of Bruce in Algeria and Tunis. According to Playfair, “These hills are covered with countless numbers of the most interesting mega-lithic remains”. The French colonists took control of the site in 1881, began investigations and maintained it until 1960. During this period, the site was systematically excavated.

Description
 
Located at the intersection of six roads, the city was walled but not fortified.
Originally designed for a population of around 15,000, the city quickly outgrew its original specifications and spilled beyond the orthogonal grid in a more loosely organized fashion.

At the time of its founding, the area surrounding the city was a fertile agricultural area, about 1000 meters above sea level.

The original Roman grid plan is magnificently visible in the orthogonal design, highlighted by the decumanus maximus (east–west-oriented street) and the cardo (north–south-oriented street) lined by a partially restored Corinthian colonnade. The cardo does not proceed completely through the city but instead terminates in a forum at the intersection with the decumanus.

At the west end of the decumanus rises a 12 m high triumphal arch, called the Arch of Trajan, which was partially restored in 1900. The arch is principally of sandstone, and is of the Corinthian order with three arches, the central one being 11' wide. The arch is also known as the Timgad Arch.

A 3,500-seat theater is in good condition and is used for contemporary productions. The other key buildings include four thermae, a library, and a basilica.

The Capitoline Temple is dedicated to Jupiter and is of approximately the same dimensions as the Pantheon in Rome. Nearby the capitol is a square church, with a circular apse dating from the 7th century CE. One of the sanctuaries featured iconography of (Dea) Africa. South of the city is a large Byzantine citadel built in the later days of the city.

Library

The Library at Timgad was a gift to the Roman people by Julius Quintianus Flavius Rogatianus at a cost of 400,000 sesterces. As no additional information about this benefactor has been unearthed, the precise date of the library's construction remains uncertain. Based on the remaining archaeological evidence, it has been suggested by scholars that it dates from the late 3rd or possibly the 4th century.

It consists of a large semi-circular room flanked by two secondary rectangular rooms, and preceded by a U-shaped colonnaded portico surrounding three sides on an open court. The portico is flanked by two long narrow rooms on each side, and the large vaulted hall would have combined the functions of a reading room, stack room, and perhaps a lecture room. Oblong alcoves held wooden shelves along walls that would likely have been complete with sides, backs and doors, based on additional evidence found at the library at Ephesus.

It is possible that free-standing bookcases in the center of the room, as well as a reading desk, might also have been present. While the architecture of the Library at Timgad is not especially remarkable, the discovery of the library is historically important as it shows the presence of a fully developed library system in this Roman city, indicating a high standard of learning and culture. While there is no evidence as to the size of the collection the library harbored, it is estimated that it could have accommodated 3,000 scrolls.

World Heritage Site
Timgad was inscribed as a World Heritage Site by UNESCO in 1982.

Gallery

See also
Djémila
Jerash
Lambaesis
Colonia (Roman)
 List of cultural assets of Algeria

References

External links

UNESCO site on Timgad
Great Buildings entry on Timgad
Images of Timgad on Manar al-Athar digital heritage photography archive
Photos of Timgad
Information on Roman Africa
 Map Location of Timgad

Roman towns and cities in Algeria
Coloniae (Roman)
Numidia (Roman provinces)
Roman sites in Algeria
Archaeological sites in Algeria
Buildings and structures in Batna Province
Roman fortifications in Roman Africa
Former populated places in Algeria
Populated places established in the 2nd century
100s establishments
100s establishments in the Roman Empire
Ancient libraries
Communes of Batna Province
World Heritage Sites in Algeria